Edgar Davis (born 2 September 1940) is a South African sprinter. He competed in the men's 400 metres at the 1960 Summer Olympics.

References

1940 births
Living people
Athletes (track and field) at the 1960 Summer Olympics
South African male sprinters
Olympic athletes of South Africa
Sportspeople from Kimberley, Northern Cape